Twerp is a 2013 children's book by Mark M. Goldblatt about a little boy named Julian who is friends with a boy named Lonnie. Bullying is one theme of the book. This book is to help people remember "what makes a good friend".

It was published by Random House.

Reviews 
 Karen Coats
 Thebookbag
 Kirkus

References 

2013 children's books
American children's novels
Random House books